Yadwad  is a village in the southern state of Karnataka, India. It is located in the Gokak taluk of Belagavi district in Karnataka.

Demographics
In 2020 India census, Yadwad had a population of 19231 with 18232 males and 999 females.

See also
 Belgaum
 Districts of Karnataka

References

External links
 http://Belgaum.nic.in/

Villages in Belagavi district